Sanath Nishantha (born 3 May 1975) is a Sri Lankan politician and a member of the Parliament of Sri Lanka. He was elected from Puttalam District in 2015. He is a member of the United People's Freedom Alliance.

Legal issues

Arrests for assault
Sanath Nishantha has been arrested several times for assaults. In 2008, he and his brother Jagath Samantha assaulted and obstructed the duties of the then Arachchikattuwa Divisional Secretary, and again in 2015 during the presidential election he and his supporters attacked an office of the candidate Maithripala Sirisena and assaulted his supporters.

Illegal environmental destruction
In 2020, a video was provided to the media in which Nishantha was seen attempting to force forest conservationists and locals to allow the mangroves in Negombo to be destroyed to build a volleyball court. When a state official questioned the impact the destruction would have on the valuable coastal mangrove ecosystem and pointed out how such continued deforestation throughout the country would lead to future generations not having any oxygen to breathe, one of Nishanthas supporters claimed that the local children "do not need oxygen". Environment and Wildlife Resources Minister S.M. Chandrasena said Sanath Nishantha was ignorant of the Wildlife Protection Act but even after the incident Nishantha claimed he would not stop despite the opposition.

In August 2020, at least an acre of a Ramsar wetland in Anawilundawa in Puttalam was illegally cleared for shrimp farming. This caused massive outrage and a committee was appointed to the investigation. The police investigation revealed that Jagath Samantha, the brother of Sanath Nishantha, directed the destruction.

Contempt of Court
The Court of Appeal issued a warrant to arrest Sanath Nishantha on 22 October 2022 after he failed to appear on court over contempt of court charges on 29 September and 5 October.

References

Living people
Members of the 15th Parliament of Sri Lanka
Members of the 16th Parliament of Sri Lanka
Sri Lanka Podujana Peramuna politicians
1975 births